Elections were held on November 2, 2010, to determine Mississippi's four members of the United States House of Representatives. Representatives were elected for two-year terms to serve in the 112th United States Congress from January 3, 2011, until January 3, 2013. Primary elections were held on June 1, 2010, and primary runoff elections on June 22.

Of the four elections, the 1st district was rated as competitive by Sabato's Crystal Ball, and the 1st and 4th districts were rated as competitive by The Cook Political Report, CQ Politics and The Rothenberg Political Report.

The Republican Party flipped the 1st and 4th districts, defeating incumbent Democrats Travis Childers and Gene Taylor, respectively. Two incumbents were re-elected; Democrat Bennie Thompson of the 2nd district and Republican Gregg Harper of the 3rd district. In total, three Republicans and one Democrat were elected, marking the first time since 1996 that the Republican Party won a majority of Mississippi's congressional districts, and only the second time since Reconstruction. A total of 788,549 votes were cast, of which 423,579 (54 percent) were for Republican candidates, 350,695 (44 percent) were for Democratic candidates, 6,560 (1 percent) were for an independent candidate, 4,292 (1 percent) were for Reform Party candidates, 2,188 (0.3 percent) were for Libertarian Party candidates and 1,235 (0.2 percent) were for a Constitution Party candidate.

Overview
Results of the 2010 United States House of Representatives elections in Mississippi by district:

District 1

In 2010 the 1st district included Horn Lake, Olive Branch, Southaven and Tupelo. The district's population was 69 percent white and 27 percent black (see Race and ethnicity in the United States Census); 77 percent were high school graduates and 17 percent had received a bachelor's degree or higher. Its median income was $38,944. In the 2008 presidential election the district gave 62 percent of its vote to Republican nominee John McCain and 37 percent to Democratic nominee Barack Obama. In 2010 the district had a Cook Partisan Voting Index of R+14.

Democrat Travis Childers, who was elected in a 2008 special election, was the incumbent. Childers was re-elected in the regularly-scheduled 2008 election with 55 percent of the vote. In May 2009 Childers denied planning to switch parties and seek re-election as a Republican, describing himself as a "Southern Democrat". In 2010 the Republican nominee was Alan Nunnelee, a member of the Mississippi State Senate. A. G. Baddley, an electrician; Les Green, a teacher; Rick "Rico" Hoskins; and Wally Pang, a retired restaurateur, ran as independent candidates. Gail Giaramita, a nurse, ran as the Constitution Party nominee. Harold Taylor, a former chair of the Libertarian Party of Mississippi, ran as the Libertarian Party nominee. Barbara Dale Washer, a teacher, ran as the Reform Party nominee.

Angela McGlowan, a Fox News political analyst; and Henry Ross, a former mayor of Eupora, also ran for the Republican nomination. Greg Davis, the mayor of Southaven who ran unsuccessfully in both 2008 elections, said in March 2009 that he would not run again in 2010. Merle Flowers, a member of the Mississippi Senate, met with the National Republican Congressional Committee in June 2009, but ultimately decided not to run.

Childers raised $1,817,037 and spent $1,796,376. Nunnelee raised $1,739,384 and spent $1,617,120. Green raised $40,296 and spent the same amount. Pang raised no money and spent $6,900. Giaramita raised $12,730 and spent $12,913.

In a poll of 303 likely voters, conducted in June 2010 by the Tarrance Group for Nunnelee's campaign, 50 percent of respondents supported Nunnelee while 42 percent favored Childers and 8 percent were undecided. In an Anzalone-Liszt poll of 400 likely voters, conducted in August and September 2010, Childers led with 46 percent to Nunnelee's 41 percent. Republican internal polls of 300 likely voters by Tarrance, conducted in September and October 2010, found Nunnelee leading Childers by 48 percent to 41 percent and by 51 percent to 40 percent respectively. A poll of 603 likely voters, conducted by Penn Schoen Berland in October 2010, found Nunnelee leading Childers by 44 percent to 39 percent with 12 percent undecided.

Sabato's Crystal Ball rated the race as "Leans Republican". In October 2010 The Cook Political Report rated the race as a "toss up" and CQ Politics rated the race as a "tossup". In November 2010The Rothenberg Political Report rated it as "Toss-up/Tilt Republican". FiveThirtyEights forecast gave Nunnelee an 82 percent chance of winning, and projected that he would receive 52 percent of the vote to Childers's 45 percent.

On election day Nunnelee was elected with 55 percent of the vote to Childers's 41 percent. Nunnelee was re-elected in 2012 and 2014. Childers unsuccessfully ran for the U.S. Senate in 2014.

Republican primary results

General election results

External links
 
 
 
 
 

District 2

In 2010 the 2nd district included Clinton, Greenville and parts of Jackson. The district's population was 66 percent black and 32 percent white (see Race and ethnicity in the United States Census); 75 percent were high school graduates and 18 percent had received a bachelor's degree or higher. Its median income was $30,578. In the 2008 presidential election the district gave 66 percent of its vote to Democratic nominee Barack Obama and 33 percent to Republican nominee John McCain.

Democrat Bennie Thompson, who took office in 1993, was the incumbent. Thompson was re-elected in 2008 with 69 percent of the vote. In 2010 the Republican nominee was Bill Marcy, a former police officer. George Bailey and Richard Cook, a teacher, also ran in the Republican primary. Ashley Norwood ran as the Reform Party nominee.

Thompson raised $1,808,681 and spent $1,343,456. Marcy raised $47,933 and spent $40,847. In a poll of 442 registered voters and likely voters, conducted by JMC Enterprises in September 2010, 35 percent of respondents intended to vote for Thompson while 34 percent intended to vote for Marcy and 31 percent were undecided. A JMC poll of 441 registered voters and likely voters conducted in October 2010 found Thompson leading with 42 percent to Marcy's 41 percent, while 17 percent were undecided. Prior to the election ''FiveThirtyEights forecast gave Thompson a 99 percent chance of winning, and projected that he would receive 57 percent of the vote to Marcy's 40 percent.

On election day Thompson was re-elected with 61 percent of the vote to Marcy's 38 percent. Thompson was re-elected in 2012 and 2014. Marcy ran again in the 2nd district in 2012 and sought the Democratic nomination for the U.S. Senate in 2014.

Republican primary results

Republican primary runoff results

General election results

External links
 
 

District 3

In 2010 the 3rd district included Meridian, Pearl and parts of Jackson. The district's population was 62 percent white and 34 percent black (see Race and ethnicity in the United States Census); 81 percent were high school graduates and 23 percent had received a bachelor's degree or higher. Its median income was $38,777. In the 2008 presidential election the district gave 61 percent of its vote to Republican nominee John McCain and 39 percent to Democratic nominee Barack Obama.

Republican Gregg Harper, who was first elected in 2008, was the incumbent. In 2008 Harper received 63 percent of the vote. In 2010 the Democratic nominee was Joel Gill, the mayor of Pickens. James D. Jackson, a sociology professor; and Shawn O'Hara, a frequent candidate for office, also sought the Democratic nomination. O'Hara's sister, Tracella Lou O'Hara Hill, also ran as the Reform Party nominee.

Harper raised $715,014 and spent $688,959. Prior to the election FiveThirtyEight's forecast gave Harper a 100 percent chance of winning, and projected that he would receive 70 percent of the vote to Gill's 28 percent. On election day Harper was re-elected with 68 percent of the vote to Gill's 31 percent. Gill unsuccessfully ran for Mississippi Agriculture Commissioner in 2011, and died in a car accident in October 2012. Harper was again re-elected in 2012 and 2014.

Democratic primary results

General election results

External links
 

District 4

In 2010 the 4th district included Gulfport and Hattiesburg. The district's population was 71 percent white and 23 percent black (see Race and ethnicity in the United States Census); 81 percent were high school graduates and 18 percent had received a bachelor's degree or higher. Its median income was $41,245. In the 2008 presidential election the district gave 67 percent of its vote to Republican nominee John McCain and 32 percent to Democratic nominee Barack Obama. In 2010 the district had a Cook Partisan Voting Index of R+20.

Democrat Gene Taylor, who took office in 1989, was the incumbent. Taylor was re-elected in 2008 with 75 percent of the vote. In 2010 Taylor's opponent in the general election was Steven Palazzo, a member of the Mississippi House of Representatives. Joe Tegerdine, a businessman, also sought the Republican nomination. Tim Hampton, the Libertarian Party nominee, and Anna Jewel Revies, the nominee of the Reform Party, also ran.

Taylor raised $855,983 and spent $968,943. Palazzo raised $1,079,453 and spent $1,026,476. Tegerdine raised $74,586 and spent $74,500.

In a poll by the Tarrance Group, conducted for Palazzo's campaign in September 2010, 45 percent of respondents supported Taylor while 41 percent favored Palazzo. In October 2010 Taylor said his own internal polling showed him leading Palazzo by eight percentage points. Another poll by Tarrance for Palazzo's campaign, conducted later in October 2010 with a sample size of 300 likely voters, Palazzo led with 43 percent to Taylor's 41 percent, while 3 percent supported other candidates and 12 percent were undecided.

In October 2010 The Cook Political Report rated the race as a "toss up" and CQ Politics rated the race as a "tossup". In November 2010 The Rothenberg Political Report rated the race as "Pure Toss-up". Prior to the election FiveThirtyEight'''s forecast gave Palazzo a 59 percent chance of winning and projected that he would receive 50 percent of the vote to Taylor's 48 percent.

On election day Palazzo was elected with 52 percent of the vote to Taylor's 47 percent. Palazzo was re-elected in 2012 and 2014. In 2014 Taylor unsuccessfully challenged Palazzo in the Republican primary in the 4th district.

Republican primary results

General election results

Further reading

External links

See also
 List of United States representatives from Mississippi
 United States congressional delegations from Mississippi

References

2010 Mississippi elections
Mississippi
2010